In the mathematical study of permutations and permutation patterns, a superpattern or universal permutation is a permutation that contains all of the patterns of a given length. More specifically, a k-superpattern contains all possible patterns of length k.

Definitions and example
If π is a permutation of length n, represented as a sequence of the numbers from 1 to n in some order, and s = s1, s2, ..., sk is a subsequence of π of length k, then s corresponds to a unique pattern, a permutation of length k whose elements are in the same order as s. That is, for each pair i and j of indexes, the ith element of the pattern for s should be less than the jthe element if and only if the ith element of s is less than the jth element. Equivalently, the pattern is order-isomorphic to the subsequence. For instance, if π is the permutation 25314, then it has ten subsequences of length three, forming the following patterns:

A permutation π is called a k-superpattern if its patterns of length k include all of the length-k permutations. For instance, the length-3 patterns of 25314 include all six of the length-3 permutations, so 25314 is a 3-superpattern. No 3-superpattern can be shorter, because any two subsequences that form the two patterns 123 and 321 can only intersect in a single position, so five symbols are required just to cover these two patterns.

Length bounds
 introduced the problem of determining the length of the shortest possible k-superpattern. He observed that there exists a superpattern of length k2 (given by the lexicographic ordering on the coordinate vectors of points in a square grid) and also observed that, for a superpattern of length n, it must be the case that it has at least as many subsequences as there are patterns. That is, it must be true that , from which it follows by Stirling's approximation that n ≥ k2/e2, where e ≈ 2.71828 is Euler's number.
This lower bound was later improved very slightly by
, 
who increased it to 1.000076k2/e2, disproving Arratia's conjecture that the k2/e2 lower bound was tight.

The upper bound of k2 on superpattern length proven by Arratia is not tight. After intermediate improvements,
 proved that there is a k-superpattern of length at most k(k + 1)/2 for every k.
This bound was later improved by
, who lowered it to ⌈(k2 + 1)/2⌉.

Eriksson et al. conjectured that the true length of the shortest k-superpattern is asymptotic to k2/2.
However, this is in contradiction with a conjecture of Alon on random superpatterns described below.

Random superpatterns
Researchers have also studied the length needed for a sequence generated by a random process to become a superpattern.  observes that, because the longest increasing subsequence of a random permutation has length (with high probability) approximately 2√n, it follows that a random permutation must have length at least k2/4 to have high probability of being a k-superpattern: permutations shorter than this will likely not contain the identity pattern. He attributes to Alon the conjecture that, for any , with high probability, random permutations of length  will be k-superpatterns.

See also
 Superpermutation

References

Permutation patterns